SS Camden was an American 6,653-ton tanker built by the New York Shipbuilding Company of Camden, New Jersey, for the  Charles Kurz & Co. Inc. of Pennsylvania Shipping Company. She was operated by Shell Oil Company of Wilmington, Delaware. She was launched in 1921. The ship became famous when it was torpedoed early in World War II off the West Coast of the United States off Coos Bay, Oregon, at 43.38 N, –124.48 W at 7:00 am. She had departed San Pedro, Los Angeles, California, to Portland, Oregon, with fuel oil. The ship was attacked by Japanese submarine I-25 on October 4, 1942 off Oregon. She had been stopped for engine repairs at the time of the attack. She survived the attack, but later sank on October 10. One Crew member died and went down with the ship.  The Camden was set on fire by the torpedo hit to her bow and was sinking. The crew abandoned ship and was rescued by a Swedish merchant ship, the MV Kookaburra. The Camden still on fire remained afloat. The tugboat Kenai was towing her to Astoria, Oregon, but then changed the path to Seattle, but the Camden sank off the coast of Washington state at 46.7772, -124.5208 and now rests at a depth of 312 feet.

See also

California during World War II
Battle of Los Angeles
American Theater (1939–1945)
Military history of the United States during World War II
United States home front during World War II
Home front during World War II

External links 
New York Shipbuilding Company Historical Sites
A Tribute to a Place Called Yorkship
New York Shipbuilding, Camden NJ 
A web exhibit of ship christening photos that includes twenty images of launching ceremonies at New York Shipbuilding

References 

Tankers of the United States
Ships built by New York Shipbuilding Corporation
Maritime incidents in October 1942
1920 ships
Ships sunk by Japanese submarines
World War II shipwrecks in the Pacific Ocean